Althupite (IMA symbol: Ahp) is a rare aluminium thorium uranyl phosphate mineral with complex formula written as AlTh(UO2)7(PO4)4O2(OH)5·15H2O, from a granitic pegmatite. It is named after its composition (ALuminium, THorium, Uranium, and Phosphorus).

References

Thorium minerals
Uranium(VI) minerals
Phosphate minerals
Aluminium minerals
Triclinic minerals
Minerals in space group 2